Patrick Mortensen (born 13 July 1989) is a Danish professional footballer who plays as a striker for Danish Superliga club AGF and the Denmark national team.

Progressing through the youth academies of various clubs on Amager, Mortensen made his senior debut for the flagship team on the island, Fremad Amager, in October 2006, before being signed as an emerging talent by Danish Superliga club Brøndby the following year. He never managed to break through to their first team, and as a result moved to Lyngby Boldklub, where he developed into a natural goalscorer. In 2015, he signed with Norwegian Tippeligaen club Sarpsborg 08, where he was part of their successful UEFA Europa League campaign in the 2018–19 season, reaching the group stage. He returned to Denmark in January 2019, and signed with AGF. In his second season there he scored 17 league goals, finishing runner-up to the top scorer title as the club finished in third place.

Mortensen has gained 7 caps for the Denmark U21 team, in which he scored two goals. In November 2020, he was called up to Kasper Hjulmand's senior squad for the first time.

Club career

Early career
Born in Copenhagen, through his youth years, Mortensen has represented several clubs from Copenhagen such as AB 70, Amager United and the merger youth academy of several clubs from Amager, FS Amager, which changed its name to Amager - Øens Hold in the time Mortensen played there.

Mortensen began his senior career for the second-tier Danish 1st Division club Fremad Amager. In the period before his debut at senior level, he had been allowed to practice as an amateur with club's first team by the then head coach Benny Johansen and convinced the club's professional management to offer him a more permanent contract, which he signed on 5 November 2006. He officially made his debut as a 17-year-old for the club's first team on 15 October 2006, a month after his 17th birthday, in a home game at Sundby Idrætspark against Lyngby Boldklub in the 1st Division, when he came on as a substitute for Lars Brøgger in the 84th minute. Mortensen subsequently reached a total of 10 appearances with one goal, in the home game against Thisted on 15 April 2007, in the 2006–07 season, after which Fremad Amager suffered relegation to the third-tier Danish 2nd Division.

Brøndby
With effect from 1 August 2007, Mortensen moved to Danish Superliga club Brøndby on a two-year contract and thus accompanied one of his former head coaches Peer F. Hansen to Brøndby, where Hansen had recently been hired as a U21 coach. Mortensen began his tenure at the club's reserve team in the third-tier Danish 2nd Division East, where he made his debut on 19 August 2007 in an away match against FC Roskilde. In early March 2008, Mortensen was on a three-day trial practice with the northern French Ligue 1 club Lille, but this did not result in a move.

Lyngby
On 1 September 2009, Brøndby sent Mortensen on a six-month loan to Lyngby Boldklub in the second-tier 1st Division. He played his first game for the club on 6 September, when he came on as a substitute for Anders Christiansen in a 1–0 defeat at Viborg. On 27 September, he scored his first goal, in a 3–0 win over Brabrand. On 15 December 2009, Mortensen's move to Lyngby became permanent, joining the club on a three-year deal. At the end of that same season, Lyngby earned promotion to the Superliga.

On 29 August 2010, Mortensen managed to score his first goal in the top division, in the 3–3 home draw against his former team Brøndby. The match became mostly known for Remco van der Schaaf scoring a hat-trick for the away team. Lyngby suffered relegation back to the 1st Division at the end of the next season, with Mortensen remaining in the team until the summer of 2015. He finished his five-and-a-half-year stint with the club with 172 appearances in which he scored 66 goals.

Sarpsborg 08
In March 2015, Mortensen signed with Norwegian club Sarpsborg 08, with him joining the team from June in the same year. He played his first game for the club on 26 July 2015, in an Tippeligaen fixture against Mjøndalen IF. As a starter in the match, he immediately showed goal scoring prowess by scoring his first goal for the team, which was, however, not enough for his team to win the game, as it ended in a 2–2 draw. He scored again the next league game against Rosenborg in a 3–2 loss. While at Sarpsborg, Mortensen was part of two Norwegian Football Cup finals; in 2015 and 2017. Both finals were lost, to Rosenborg and Lillestrøm, respectively.

With Sarpsborg, he participated in the group stage of the 2018–19 UEFA Europa League where he distinguished himself on 4 October 2018 by scoring a brace against Belgian club Genk, contributing to the 3–1 victory of his team. He scored another European goal against Malmö FF on 8 November in a 1–1 draw. His team, however, finished bottom of the group and failed to advance in the competition.

AGF
On 12 January 2019, Mortensen moved from Sarpsborg to AGF on a four-year contract. He scored his first goal for the club on 15 February in a 2–0 away win over SønderjyskE. He scored nine goals in his first 12 appearances for AGF, as the team reached play-offs for European football.

Mortensen experienced as strong second season in Aarhus, especially in the second half of the season, as AGF finished third in the league table. Part of the success was thanks to Mortensen's sharpness in front of goal, as he finished runner-up in the top goalscorer title of the Superliga, one goal behind Ronnie Schwartz. He made 39 league appearances in which he scored 18 goals. He was subsequently voted AGF Player of the Year for 2019–20.

Mortensen scored eight goals before the winter break of the 2020–21 Danish Superliga, along with two goals in two appearances in the Europa League, as AGF were knocked out in the second qualifying round to Slovenian club NŠ Mura.

International career
Mortensen made his debut for the Denmark under-21 national team in 2010. 

In November 2020, he was called up to Kasper Hjulmand's senior squad for the friendly against Sweden due to several cancellations from, among others, the Danish national team players playing in England, due to the COVID-19 restrictions, as well as a case of COVID-19 in the squad, which had put several national team players in quarantine. He was on the bench for the game against Sweden.

Career statistics

Club

Honours
Sarpsborg 08
 Norwegian Football Cup runner-up: 2015, 2017

Individual
 AGF Player of the Year: 2019–20

References

External links
 
 Patrick Mortensen Profile Altomfotball

1989 births
Living people
Footballers from Copenhagen
Association football forwards
Danish men's footballers
Denmark under-21 international footballers
Fremad Amager players
Brøndby IF players
Lyngby Boldklub players
Danish Superliga players
Danish 1st Division players
Danish 2nd Division players
Eliteserien players
Sarpsborg 08 FF players
Aarhus Gymnastikforening players
Danish expatriate men's footballers
Expatriate footballers in Norway
Danish expatriate sportspeople in Norway